Toby Lightman is an American singer-songwriter best known for her songs "My Sweet Song", "Holding a Heart", and "Devils and Angles". Her first album, Little Things, was released in 2004 on Lava/Atlantic. Her second album, Bird on a Wire was released in 2006. During her career, she has toured and performed with bands such as OAR, Rob Thomas, Jewel, Gavin DeGraw, Train, Prince, Marc Broussard, and Carbon Leaf. Lightman released her first independent record "Let Go" in 2010 and was the first independent artist to perform and sell on the HSN (tv network). Lightman recently released her first self-produced album After All in fall of 2022. This album was inspired by her journey through infertility and pregnancy loss to finally have 2 children.

Biography 
Raised in Cherry Hill, New Jersey, Lightman began playing the violin as a child. She was a member of the orchestra at Cherry Hill High School East and started singing when a friend urged her to join a vocal workshop class. The audience response to a solo performance in which Lightman sang a gospel version of Simon and Garfunkel's Bridge Over Troubled Water led her to pursue her talents as a singer after she graduated from high school in 1996.

Lightman taught herself to play the guitar and while in school at the University of Wisconsin–Madison.

In 2004, Ari Martin of Nettwerk Management became Lightman's manager.  After seeing Lightman play a solo showcase for record executives and representatives, Jason Flom signed Lightman to Lava Records, a subsidiary of Atlantic Records.
Lightman released her debut Little Things through Lava on March 30, 2004. The Album was produced by Peter Zizzo. A second version of Little Things was released on July 20, 2004, that included a bonus cover track of Mary J. Blige's 1992 hit single Real Love. The song was released as the album's second single and a music video was filmed to promote the track.

In late 2005, Lightman appeared on Lava Records label mates O.A.R.'s Stories of a Stranger. On that album, which peaked at number 40 on the Billboard 200, Lightman sang alongside O.A.R. frontman Marc Roberge on the track "The Stranger". Lightman was then featured as a VH1 You Oughta Know artist and as an MTV You Hear It First artist. She also appeared on such shows as Late Show with David Letterman, Late Night with Conan O'Brien, CBS's Morning show Second Cup, ESPN's Cold Pizza, A&E's Breakfast with the Arts and various others.

Bird on a Wire, Lightman's second record was released on July 25, 2006, on Atlantic Records. "My Sweet Song" from Bird on a Wire was featured near the end of the Boston Legal episode, "Desperately Seeking Shirley" while also featuring in the closing scene of the Bones episode, "The Maggots In The Meathead". It was also featured in the soundtrack to the movie P.S. I Love You.  The song "Slippin'" appeared on ABC's Brothers & Sisters. Lightman performed the opening theme to Fox Sports' coverage of the NASCAR racing season with a song titled "NASCAR Love (Let's Go Racing)".

Lightman released her third album, Let Go on her own T Killa Records label on July 15, 2008. The album is sold through digital retailers like iTunes and amazon.com. The album was available for sale through the Home Shopping Network. The song "Let Go" & "One Day" from Let Go will be featured in a series of commercials to air on HSN.  The song "Let Go" has also appeared on ABC's Brothers & Sisters and Dirty, Sexy, Money.  A new song "Color" is on a new benefit compilation that was released by the Hard Rock Cafe and the folks from World Hunger Year.

On June 5, 2010, Lightman released her fourth album, Know Where I'm From also on her T Killa Records label.  This album contains 11 acoustic versions of her previously released songs. Her fans chose the songs on this album. Lightman also crafted a "Know Where I'm From" book that consisted of her story behind each song as well as fans written in stories of connection with those songs.

In 2011, Lightman's new song "Holding a Heart" was featured in the film What's Your Number?, originally credited to "Girl Named Toby", but later brought into Lightman's catalogue. It since has been featured on multiple tv shows. Also, another new song "Addicted" by Lightman was never released as an official single, but was featured as a promo of the twelfth episode from the eighth season of Desperate Housewives and in the television film Mean Girls 2. 

On October 27, 2014, she released the album "Every Kind of People," using the PledgeMusic platform to reach out to her fans to support the making of the record and interacting with them through frequent updates, special offers and private performances.

Toby is currently writing, producing and mixing new songs for a new album due later this year.  "Spaces" released on February 1, 2018, was the first song of this series. "Breathe In" is to be released April 24, 2018.  These songs mark the journey she took to motherhood.

Discography

Albums

Studio albums

Extended plays

Singles

References

External links 
 
 
 

1978 births
Living people
American women singer-songwriters
Atlantic Records artists
Lava Records artists
Singer-songwriters from New Jersey
Cherry Hill High School East alumni
People from Cherry Hill, New Jersey
University of Wisconsin–Madison alumni
21st-century American women singers
21st-century American singers